James Webb (died 14 May 1761) was an officer of the Royal Navy, who served as colonial governor of Newfoundland. He was born in England, and died at Plymouth Sound.

Naval career
Webb joined in the Royal Navy in 1728. He became governor of Newfoundland in 1760 during the Seven Years' War. Because Webb had taken three captured Inuit to Chateau Bay, gave them gifts, and released them they in turn stimulated more regular commerce with the Labrador Inuit. Webb claimed Chateau Bay for Britain and renamed it York Harbour.

See also 
 Governors of Newfoundland
 List of people from Newfoundland and Labrador

References

Sources

External links
Biography at Government House The Governorship of Newfoundland and Labrador

1761 deaths
Governors of Newfoundland Colony
Royal Navy officers
Year of birth unknown